Senator Frazier may refer to:

Members of the United States Senate
James B. Frazier (1856–1937), U.S. Senator from Tennessee from 1905 to 1911
Lynn Frazier (1874–1947), U.S. Senator from North Dakota from 1923 to 1941

United States state senate members
Hillman Terome Frazier (born 1950), Mississippi State Senate
William Frazier (Virginia politician) (1812–1885), Virginia State Senate

See also
Senator Fraser (disambiguation)